Megumi Fujii (藤井 恵 Fujii Megumi, born April 26, 1974) is a retired Japanese mixed martial artist.

Biography

Fujii  started Judo at the age of 3 due to her father's influence and continued Judo at Shukugawa Gakuin Junior High School and Kokushikan University. She retired from Judo after graduating from university with a degree in physical education. In judo's stead, she got interested and begun training combat sambo.

Fujii specializes mainly in submission fighting and is renowned for her quick takedowns and submissions. Her most popular move is the Inazuma Toe Hold submission, dubbed the Megulock. She also holds black belts in both Judo and Brazilian Jiu-Jitsu.

Fujii was trained in MMA by Shooto veteran Hiroyuki Abe and professional wrestler, PRIDE Fighting Championships alumni, former UFC Heavyweight Champion and King of Pancrase Josh Barnett. She has trained several other female MMA fighters herself, including current top fighter Hitomi Akano.

Fujii is also a highly decorated fighter outside of mixed martial arts, with accomplishments including Japanese National Sambo and Brazilian Jiu-Jitsu Champion, four Second Place finishes in the World Sambo Championships, Ground Impact Professional BJJ Tournament Champion and 2004 and 2006 BJJ Pan-Am Champion.

In 2005 and 2007, she earned Third Place finishes in the ADCC Under-60 kg. World Submission Championships.

Fujii was also a multi-time contestant on the seasonal Japanese obstacle course television show Sasuke (Ninja Warrior), but never made it past the first stage.

Mixed martial arts career
Fujii debuted in mixed martial arts on August 5, 2004 and defeated Yumi Matsumoto by submission in just 40 seconds. She then went on to defeat former UFC commentator Erica Montoya at HOOKnSHOOT: "Evolution" in what would be Montoya's final fight.

Further wins over Ana Michelle Tavares, Misaki Takimoto, Keiko "Tama Chan" Tamai and Masako Yoshida established Fujii as one of the top female fighters in the world and she became a staple of Shooto and Smackgirl events.

On November 29, 2006, she faced Australian fighter Serin Murray. Murray claimed before the fight that she studied Fujii tactics and that she would defeat Fujii by KO. However, the Australian fighter left her forward leg exposed inviting Fujii for an attack on it. Fujii went for Murray's legs and won via submission.

She faced Cody Welchin at NFF – The Breakout on March 10, 2007. She won the fight by armbar submission in the first round.

On August 24, 2007, Fujii defeated highly touted American Lisa Ellis by first-round submission at a BodogFight event in Vancouver, British Columbia.

Fujii defeated Cindy Hales and Korean star Seo Hee Ham to advance to the finals of the 2008 Smackgirl World ReMix Grand Prix, but the promotion folded amidst financial troubles before the final round.

In November 2008, the newly rebranded Smackgirl, now known as Jewels, featured Fujii at its debut "First Ring" event. Fujii defeated Tomoko Morii by submission in the first round.

After submitting Won Bun Chu in less than one minute at Shooto: "Tradition Final" in May 2009, Fujii returned to Jewels and defeated rising Japanese contender Saori Ishioka late in the second round.

She defeated veteran striker "Windy" Tomomi Sunaba by first-round armbar at Shooto: "Revolutionary Exchanges 3" on November 23, 2009.

On May 6, 2010, it was announced that Fujii would compete at Bellator 22 on June 10. Bellator later changed the numbering of their events and the June 10 card was renamed Bellator 21. Fujii faced Sarah Schneider and defeated Schneider by TKO in the third round. It marked Fujii's first victory by TKO in her 20-fight career.

Fujii took part in the Bellator 115-pound women's tournament in Season Three, which began on August 12, 2010. She was set to face Angela Magaña in the first round of the tournament at Bellator 24, but Magana withdrew from the tournament on August 8, 2010 after suffering a foot injury.

Fujii instead faced two-time All-American wrestler Carla Esparza. She defeated Esparza by armbar submission in the second round.

Fujii once again faced Lisa Ellis in the second round of the Bellator tournament at Bellator 31 and won the rematch by armbar submission in the first round.

With the victory, Fujii became only the second mixed martial artist, male or female, to begin a career with 22 consecutive victories. She faced Zoila Gurgel in the finals of the tournament at Bellator 34 on October 28, 2010. Fujii lost the fight via a questionable split decision.

Fujii faced Emi Fujino at World Victory Road Presents: Soul of Fight on December 30, 2010 and defeated Fujino by unanimous decision.

Fujii rematched Mika Nagano at Jewels 15th Ring on July 9, 2011. She defeated Nagano by unanimous decision.

Fujii faced Karla Benitez at DREAM – Fight For Japan: Genki Desu Ka Omisoka 2011 on December 31, 2011. She defeated Benitez by submission due to an armbar in the first round.

Fujii returned to Bellator to face Jessica Aguilar at Bellator 69 on May 18, 2012. She was defeated by unanimous decision.

Fujii was rumored to be competing at DREAM 18 on New Year's Eve 2012. However, she instead faced Mei Yamaguchi at Vale Tudo Japan 2012 on December 24. Fujii defeated Yamaguchi by unanimous decision.

On June 22, 2013, Fujii announced that she would retire from MMA after competing one final time. In her retirement bout, she faced Jessica Aguilar in a rematch at Vale Tudo Japan 3rd on October 5 in Tokyo. Fujii was initially defeated by TKO when the doctor stopped the fight after round two due to an eye injury that was caused by two accidental eye pokes. The result of the fight was later changed to a technical majority decision win for Aguilar.

Personal life
Fujii is married to fellow mixed martial artist Shinji Sasaki, and they have a child.

Mixed martial arts record

|-
| Loss
| align=center | 26–3
| Jessica Aguilar
| Technical Decision (eye pokes)
| Vale Tudo Japan 3rd
| 
| align=center | 2
| align=center | 5:00
| Tokyo, Japan
| 
|-
| Win
| align=center | 26–2
| Mei Yamaguchi
| Decision (unanimous)
| Vale Tudo Japan 2012
| 
| align=center | 2
| align=center | 5:00
| Tokyo, Japan
|
|-
| Loss
| align=center | 25–2
| Jessica Aguilar
| Decision (unanimous)
| Bellator 69
| 
| align=center | 3
| align=center | 5:00
| Lake Charles, Louisiana, United States
|
|-
| Win
| align=center | 25–1
| Karla Benitez
| Submission (armbar)
| Fight For Japan: Genki Desu Ka Omisoka 2011
| 
| align=center | 1
| align=center | 1:15
| Saitama, Saitama, Japan
|
|-
| Win
| align=center | 24–1
| Mika Nagano
| Decision (unanimous)
| Jewels 15th Ring
| 
| align=center | 2
| align=center | 5:00
| Tokyo, Japan
|
|-
| Win
| align=center | 23–1
| Emi Fujino
| Decision (unanimous)
| World Victory Road Presents: Soul of Fight
| 
| align=center | 3
| align=center | 5:00
| Tokyo, Japan
|
|-
| Loss
| align=center | 22–1
| Zoila Frausto Gurgel
| Decision (split)
| Bellator 34
| 
| align=center | 5
| align=center | 5:00
| Hollywood, Florida, United States
| 
|-
| Win
| align=center | 22–0
| Lisa Ellis
| Submission (armbar)
| Bellator 31
| 
| align=center | 1
| align=center | 1:39
| Lake Charles, Louisiana, United States
| 
|-
| Win
| align=center | 21–0
| Carla Esparza
| Submission (armbar)
| Bellator 24
| 
| align=center | 2
| align=center | 0:57
| Hollywood, Florida, United States
| 
|-
| Win
| align=center | 20–0
| Sarah Schneider
| TKO (punches)
| Bellator 21
| 
| align=center | 3
| align=center | 1:58
| Hollywood, Florida, United States
|
|-
| Win
| align=center | 19–0
| Tomomi Sunaba
| Submission (armbar)
| Shooto: Revolutionary Exchanges 3
| 
| align=center | 1
| align=center | 3:24
| Tokyo, Japan
|
|-
| Win
| align=center | 18–0
| Saori Ishioka
| Submission (armbar)
| Jewels 4th Ring
| 
| align=center | 2
| align=center | 4:17
| Tokyo, Japan
|
|-
| Win
| align=center | 17–0
| Won Bun Chu
| Submission (keylock)
| Shooto: Shooto Tradition Final
| 
| align=center | 1
| align=center | 0:52
| Tokyo, Japan
|
|-
| Win
| align=center | 16–0
| Tomoko Morii
| Submission (armbar)
| Jewels 1st Ring
| 
| align=center | 1
| align=center | 1:05
| Tokyo, Japan
|
|-
| Win
| align=center | 15–0
| Seo Hee Ham
| Submission (armbar)
| Smackgirl: World ReMix 2008 Second Round
| 
| align=center | 1
| align=center | 3:39
| Tokyo, Japan
| 
|-
| Win
| align=center | 14–0
| Cindy Hales
| Submission (armbar)
| Smackgirl: World ReMix 2008 Opening Round
| 
| align=center | 2
| align=center | 0:27
| Tokyo, Japan
| 
|-
| Win
| align=center | 13–0
| Mika Nagano
| Submission (triangle choke)
| Smackgirl: Starting Over
| 
| align=center | 1
| align=center | 1:20
| Tokyo, Japan
|
|-
| Win
| align=center | 12–0
| Kyoko Takabayashi
| Decision (unanimous)
| Shooto: Back To Our Roots 6
| 
| align=center | 2
| align=center | 5:00
| Tokyo, Japan
|
|-
| Win
| align=center | 11–0
| Lisa Ellis
| Submission (armbar)
| BodogFight: Vancouver
| 
| align=center | 1
| align=center | 4:50
| Vancouver, British Columbia, Canada
|
|-
| Win
| align=center | 10–0
| Cody Welchlin
| Submission (armbar)
| NFF: The Breakout
| 
| align=center | 1
| align=center | 2:40
| Minneapolis, Minnesota, United States
|
|-
| Win
| align=center | 9–0
| Masako Yoshida
| Submission (heel hook)
| Shooto: Battle Mix Tokyo 1
| 
| align=center | 1
| align=center | 0:51
| Tokyo, Japan
|
|-
| Win
| align=center | 8–0
| Serin Murray
| Submission (toe hold)
| Smackgirl: Legend of Extreme Women
| 
| align=center | 1
| align=center | 0:20
| Tokyo, Japan
|
|-
| Win
| align=center | 7–0
| Keiko Tamai
| Submission (armbar)
| Smackgirl: Top Girl Battle
| 
| align=center | 1
| align=center | 0:53
| Tokyo, Japan
|
|-
| Win
| align=center | 6–0
| Misaki Takimoto
| Technical Submission (armbar)
| Shooto: The Victory of the Truth
| 
| align=center | 2
| align=center | 4:36
| Tokyo, Japan
|
|-
| Win
| align=center | 5–0
| Dah Le Chon
| Submission (rear-naked choke)
| G-Shooto: G-Shooto 03
| 
| align=center | 1
| align=center | 0:19
| Tokyo, Japan
|
|-
| Win
| align=center | 4–0
| Ana Michelle Tavares
| Decision (unanimous)
| G-Shooto: G-Shooto 02
| 
| align=center | 2
| align=center | 5:00
| Tokyo, Japan
|
|-
| Win
| align=center | 3–0
| Nadia van der Wel
| Submission (armbar)
| Shooto: Year End Show 2004
| 
| align=center | 1
| align=center | 1:43
| Tokyo, Japan
|
|-
| Win
| align=center | 2–0
| Erica Montoya
| Decision (unanimous)
| HOOKnSHOOT: Evolution
| 
| align=center | 3
| align=center | 5:00
| Evansville, Indiana, United States
|
|-
| Win
| align=center | 1–0
| Yumi Matsumoto
| Submission (rear-naked choke)
| Smackgirl: Holy Land Triumphal Return
| 
| align=center | 1
| align=center | 0:40
| Tokyo, Japan
|

See also
 List of female mixed martial artists

References

External links

 Megumi Fujii Awakening profile
 
 Megumi Fujii's official blog 
 Megumi Fujii's myspace

1974 births
Living people
Japanese female mixed martial artists
Japanese practitioners of Brazilian jiu-jitsu
People awarded a black belt in Brazilian jiu-jitsu
Female Brazilian jiu-jitsu practitioners
Japanese submission wrestlers
Japanese female judoka
Japanese sambo practitioners
People from Okayama Prefecture
Mixed martial artists utilizing judo
Mixed martial artists utilizing sambo
Mixed martial artists utilizing Brazilian jiu-jitsu
20th-century Japanese women
21st-century Japanese women